Ami Chand is a Fiji Indian politician who won the Ba West Indian Communal Constituency, one of the 19 seats reserved for Fiji citizens of Indian origin, for the Fiji Labour Party during the 1999 elections for the House of Representatives.

On 19 May 2000, he was among the 43 members of the People's Coalition Government, led by Mahendra Chaudhry, taken hostage by George Speight and his band of rebel Republic of Fiji Military Forces (RFMF) soldiers from the Counter Revolutionary Warfare Unit. He was released on 21 May 2000, after he signed a paper resigning his seat in Parliament.

References 

Fiji Labour Party politicians
Indian members of the House of Representatives (Fiji)
Fijian Hindus
Living people
Politicians from Ba Province
Year of birth missing (living people)